December 2012

See also

References

 12
December 2012 events in the United States